Culver City Boys or Culver City 13 (CCB13) is a Mexican-American street gang from Mar Vista, California.

According to a Los Angeles City Beat article, by 2003, many Culver City Boys left the Mar Vista Housing housing projects due to strict rules that evict gang members and increased police presence. The gang is under a civil injunction enforced by the LAPD which restricts gang members' activity within a defined boundary surrounding the projects.  However, the gang remains active, as the constitutionality of the injunction has been tested.  Alleged members of the gang settled a class action suit over the practice of enforcing curfews for suspected gang members with the City of Los Angeles for $30 million dollars towards job training and apprenticeships.

Despite the Culver City Boys being a Sureño gang, their colors are red and black, colors mainly associated with the Norteños and Pirus. CCB13 shows no affiliation to either Norteño or Bloods alliances.

References

External links
Injunction against Culver City Boyz
Los Angeles Courts Help Fight Gangs at the New York Times
DEA/Detroit Police Department Homicide Task Force Dismantles Drug Ring

Sureños
Latino street gangs
Gangs in Los Angeles
Mexican-American culture in Los Angeles
Culver City, California